Apopestes is a genus of moths in the family Erebidae.

Species
 Apopestes centralasiae Warren, 1913
 Apopestes curiosa
 Apopestes indica Moore, 1883
 Apopestes koreana Herz, 1904
 Apopestes noe Ronkay, 1990
 Apopestes phantasma Eversmann, 1843
 Apopestes spectrum Esper, 1787

References
 Apopestes at Markku Savela's Lepidoptera and Some Other Life Forms
 Natural History Museum Lepidoptera genus database
 Zootaxa 1876:19.

Toxocampinae
Moth genera